The NORCECA qualification for the 2018 FIVB Volleyball Men's World Championship saw member nations compete for five places at the finals in Italy and Bulgaria. The top three teams from the 2017 Men's NORCECA Volleyball Championship, plus two teams from the final four qualified for the 2018 World Championship. Therefore, the first two rounds of the 2018 World Championship qualification also acted as qualifiers for the 2017 NORCECA Championship.

Originally the 2017 NORCECA Championship was the only competition from the area to offer the 2018 World Championship qualification quota, but due to the pass of hurricanes Irma and Maria for the Caribbean sea, Cuba and Puerto Rico were unable to compete, NORCECA authorities decided to make the final four tournament - Cuba, Puerto Rico and the 4th and 5th placed teams of the 2017 NORCECA Championship.

Pools composition
41 NORCECA national teams entered qualification. The top six ranked teams from the NORCECA Ranking as of 1 January 2016 (United States, Canada, Cuba, Puerto Rico, Mexico and Costa Rica) automatically qualified for the 2017 NORCECA Championship or the final four. But, Bonaire and Saba later withdrew.

First round

CAZOVA
14 CAZOVA national teams entered qualification. The top two ranked teams from CAZOVA did not compete in the first round and automatically qualified for the second round. Teams ranked 3–14 from CAZOVA were seeded following the serpentine system according to their position in the NORCECA Ranking as of 1 January 2016. Pools composition was determined by taking into consideration – as far as possible – the geographical location of the various countries. But, Bonaire later withdrew. Rankings are shown in brackets.

ECVA
14 ECVA national teams entered qualification. The top two ranked teams from ECVA did not compete in the first round and automatically qualified for the second round. Teams ranked 3–14 from ECVA were seeded following the serpentine system according to their position in the NORCECA Ranking as of 1 January 2016. Pools composition was determined by taking into consideration – as far as possible – the geographical location of the various countries. But, Saba later withdrew. Rankings are shown in brackets.

AFECAVOL
7 AFECAVOL national teams entered qualification. One round was held with a Round-robin tournament of all 7 teams. NORCECA Ranking as of 1 January 2016 are shown in brackets.

Second round

CAZOVA
NORCECA Ranking as of 1 January 2016 are shown in brackets.

ECVA
NORCECA Ranking as of 1 January 2016 are shown in brackets.

Final round

Pool standing procedure
 Number of matches won
 Match points
 Sets ratio
 Points ratio
 If the tie continues as per the point ratio between two teams, the priority will be given to the team which won the last match between them. When the tie in points ratio is between three or more teams, a new classification of these teams in the terms of points 1, 2 and 3 will be made taking into consideration only the matches in which they were opposed to each other.

Match won 3–0: 5 match points for the winner, 0 match points for the loser
Match won 3–1: 4 match points for the winner, 1 match point for the loser
Match won 3–2: 3 match points for the winner, 2 match points for the loser

First round
The top two teams in each CAZOVA and ECVA pool qualified for the second round, whereas the top two teams from AFECAVOL qualified for the 2017 NORCECA Championship.

CAZOVA Pool A
Venue:  Palais des Sports de Rivière-Salée, Rivière-Salée, Martinique
Dates: 22–23 October 2016
All times are Atlantic Standard Time (UTC−04:00).

CAZOVA Pool B
Venue:  Anthony Nesty Sporthal, Paramaribo, Suriname
Dates: 30–31 October 2016
All times are Suriname Time (UTC−03:00).

CAZOVA Pool C
Venue:  Gymnasium Vincent, Port-au-Prince, Haiti
Dates: 9–10 July 2016
All times are Eastern Daylight Time (UTC−04:00).

ECVA Pool A
Venue:  YMCA Sports Complex, St. John's, Antigua and Barbuda
Dates: 9–11 September 2016
All times are Atlantic Standard Time (UTC−04:00).

Preliminary round

Finals

3rd place match

Final

Final standing

ECVA Pool B
Venue:  The La Borie Indoor Facility, St. George's, Grenada
Dates: 20–21 August 2016
All times are Atlantic Standard Time (UTC−04:00).

Preliminary round

Finals

3rd place match

Final

Final standing

ECVA Pool C
Venue:  Matthew Francois Sports Auditorium, Marigot, Saint Martin
Dates: 27–28 August 2016
All times are Atlantic Standard Time (UTC−04:00).

Preliminary round

Final

Final standing

AFECAVOL
Venue:  SCA Multipurpose Mercy Center, Belize City, Belize
Dates: 24–30 September 2016
All times are Central Standard Time (UTC−06:00).

Second round
The top two teams from the 2017 CAZOVA Championship and the winners in each ECVA pool qualified for the 2017 NORCECA Championship.

2017 CAZOVA Championship
Venue:  National Cycling Centre, Couva, Trinidad and Tobago
Dates: 4–9 July 2017
All times are Atlantic Standard Time (UTC−04:00).

Preliminary round

CAZOVA Pool D

CAZOVA Pool E

Final round

7th–8th places

7th place match

Final six

Quarterfinals

Semifinals

5th place match

3rd place match

Final

Final standing

ECVA Pool D
Venue:  Beausejour Indoor facility, Gros Islet, Saint Lucia
Dates: 12–13 August 2017
All times are Atlantic Standard Time (UTC−04:00).

Preliminary round

Finals

3rd place match

Final

Final standing

ECVA Pool E
Venue:  Beausejour Indoor facility, Gros Islet, Saint Lucia
Dates: 9–10 August 2017
All times are Atlantic Standard Time (UTC−04:00).

Preliminary round

Finals

3rd place match

Final

Final standing

Final round
The top three teams from the 2017 NORCECA Championship and the top two teams from the final four qualified for the 2018 World Championship, whereas the fourth and fifth ranked teams of the 2017 NORCECA Championship qualified for the final four.

2017 NORCECA Championship

Venues:  OTC Sports Center I, Colorado Springs, United States and  OTC Sports Center II, Colorado Springs, United States
Dates: 26 September – 1 October 2017

Final four
Venue:  Sala 19 de Noviembre, Pinar del Río, Cuba
Dates: 10–12 November 2017
All times are Cuba Standard Time (UTC−05:00).

References

External links
Official website of the Final Four
Official website of the CAZOVA Second Round
Official website of the ECVA Second Round Pool D
Official website of the ECVA Second Round Pool E
Official website of the First Round

2018 FIVB Volleyball Men's World Championship
2016 in volleyball
2017 in men's volleyball